Vignola is a city and comune in the province of Modena (Emilia-Romagna), Italy.

Its economy is based on agriculture, especially fruit farming, but there  are also mechanical industries and service companies.

The city is mostly known as the birthplace of the Renaissance architect Jacopo Barozzi da Vignola.

History

Vignola, whose name derives from the Latin vineola ("small vine") is located near an ancient Etruscan road connecting Bologna to Parma. However it is mentioned in the Middle Ages as having been founded in 826 as, according to the legend, a castle to protect the lands of the nearby Abbey of Nonantola.

Vignola was a possession of those bishops until 1247; during the wars between Guelphs and Ghibellines its territory was contented between the communes of Modena and Bologna, until the Grassoni family installed their seigniory in Vignola. This lasted until 1399, when it was acquired by the House of Este; two years later it was conceded as a county to Uguccione de' Contrari from Ferrara. With the death of Ercole Contrari in 1557, Vignola was assigned to Giacomo Boncompagni, son of Pope Gregory XIII. The Boncompagni rule fell with the Napoleonic Conquest of Italy, and, after the Congress of Vienna of 1814, Vignola became part of the Duchy of Modena.

Main sights
Town Museum
The Castle (Rocca), built perhaps in the Carolingian era but known from 1178; it was turned into a patrician residence by the Contrari family in the Renaissance era. It houses a chapel with late-Gothic frescoes (early 15th century), and a hall (Sala del Padiglione) with frescoes from the same age.
Palazzo dei Contrari 
Palazzo Boncompagni (or Palazzo Barozzi) 
Torre Galvani
Villa Martuzzi

Transport 
Vignola is served by Vignola railway station, terminus of the Casalecchio–Vignola railway.

Notable people
Jacopo Barozzi (1507–1573), architect
Giacomo Cantelli (1643–1695), cartographer
Ludovico Antonio Muratori (1672–1750), historian
Antonio Paradisi (1736–1783), poet and economist
Patrizia Reggiani (1948-), Ex-wife of Maurizio Gucci

Twin towns
 Barbezieux-Saint-Hilaire, France, since 1982
 Witzenhausen, Germany, since 1982
 Angol, Chile, since 1998

References 

 
Cities and towns in Emilia-Romagna
Castles in Italy